Lucky Number is the fourth studio album by Taiwanese singer Jolin Tsai. It was released on July 7, 2001, by Universal and D Sound. Produced by David Wu, Peter Lee, Paul Lee, Chen Wei, and Kay Huang, it incorporated music genres of pop, R&B, disco, and hip-hop.

It was well received by music critics, who commented that it was her most amazing album during her Universal period. It lacked promotion due to the contractual dispute with her management company D Sound, and it sold more than 150,000 copies in Taiwan, ranking top 20 in the year's album sales in the country.

Background and development 
On December 22, 2000, Tsai released her third studio album, Show Your Love, which sold more than 280,000 copies in Taiwan. On June 12, 2001, it was revealed that Tsai's new album would be released on July 15, 2001. On June 19, 2001, it was revealed that Tsai would record the Mandarin version of "Where the Dream Takes You", the theme song of the 2001 Disney animated film, Atlantis: The Lost Empire, making her the third singer to record the Chinese theme song for a Disney movie, following Coco Lee and Jacky Cheung.

On June 21, 2001, it was revealed that her new album would be released on July 13, 2001, and it revealed that Jay Chou had written a song named "Can't Speak Clearly" for her album. On June 30, 2001, Tsai premiered the song "Where the Dream Takes You" in Taipei, Taiwan. On July 3, 2001, it was revealed that Tsai's overseas management would be handed over to the manager of Faye Wong and Na Ying, and it revealed that she has planned to embark on a concert tour by the end of the year.

Writing and recording 

"If You Don't Want" is a high-pitch and moving ballad, with the lyrics describing Tsai's serious, persistent, trusting, and free attitude towards life and love. "Lucky Number" was inspired by songwriter Paul Lee's impression of Tsai's stage charm, with a strong and elastic rhythm.

The lyrics of "Can't Speak Clearly" describe a girl's inner conflict between two boys, its lyrics were originally written by Tsai and named the song "Dialogue", but it was replaced due to the unsuitable combination of lyrics and melody. "Bridge over Troubled Water" was originally performed by Simon & Garfunkel. It incorporated R&B and gospel elements with a passionate, high-pitch blast, and Tsai used vibrant, thick vocals to perfrom the song which talks about friendship.

Title and artwork 
Tsai's debut album, 1019, established her popularity, she thought numbers would bring her luck, so that she named the album "Lucky Number". The album has two editions—standard and deluxe editions, the former features four photo cards, while the latter features two photo books. The two photo books cost a total of NT$1.5 million, which were finally selected from more than 3,000 pictures taken in ten different scenes, such as swimming pool, library, record store, supermarket, campus, and stage. The covers of both editions chose Tsai's picture with fresh makeup and simple outfit, and the black tube top and her glowing eyes showed the aura of maturity inside her.

Release and promotion 
On June 28, 2001, Tsai held an album pre-order promotional event in Kaohsiung, Taiwan, the pre-order gift, which were limited to 20,000 copies, was a CD which includes two songs—"Where the Dream Takes You" and "Bridge over Troubled Water". On July 3, 2001, Tsai held a press conference in Taipei, Taiwan to announce that the album had been pre-ordered more than 28,000 copies in the country within 50 hours of opening for pre-order, and she also announced that the release date would be advanced to July 7, 2001. On July 14, 2001, Tsai held a signing session in Taipei, Taiwan. On July 21, 2001, she held the Lucky Number Concert in Taipei, Taiwan. The album was one of the top 20 highest-selling albums in Taiwan in 2001, and it ranked number 19 and number 20 on the 2001 year-end album sales charts of Rose Records and Tachung Records, respectively.

Live performances 
On July 8, 2001, Tsai participated in the TVBS-G television show Super Live and performed "If You Don't Want". On July 29, 2001, she attended the closing party of a 30 Hour Famine event held by Formosa TV and performed "Take It Easy". On August 12, 2001, she participated in the High Sense Concert held by Gala TV, where she performed "Take It Easy" and "Can't Speak Clearly". On August 19, 2001, she attended the Summer Music Summit held by MTV Mandarin and performed "Lucky Number", "Watch over Me", "Can't Speak Clearly", "Let Me Alone", "If You Don't Want", "Bridge over Troubled Water", and "Take It Easy." On August 23, 2001, she participated in the TVBS-G television show Super Live, where she performed "Bridge over Troubled Water" and "If You Don't Want".

On October 10, 2001, she attended the National Day Concert held by Chinese TV, where she performed "Take It Easy" and "Can't Speak Clearly". On December 24, 2001, she attended a Christmas party held by MTV Mandarin, where she performed "Can't Speak Clearly" and "If You Don't Want". On December 31, 2001, she performed "Lucky Number" and "Bridge over Troubled Water" at the New Year's Eve Concert held by TVBS-G in Taipei, Taiwan. On the same day, she attended another New Year's Eve Concert held by Gala TV in Taichung, Taiwan, where she performed "Lucky Number" and "Can't Speak Clearly". On January 25, 2002, she participated in the 8th China Music Awards and performed "Lucky Number". Since then, Tsai has been performing songs from the album at various events.

Music videos 
The music video of "If You Don't Want" was directed by Chin Cho, and it features Taiwanese actor Ryan Kuo. The music video of "Lucky Number" was directed by Milo Hsu. The music video of "Bridge over Troubled Water" was directed by Marlboro Lai. The music videos of "Can't Speak Clearly", "Watch Me", and "Catcher" were all directed by Px3.

Contractual dispute 
In early July 2001, Tsai's father Tsai Chu-chen sent legal attest letters to companies who had cooperated with Tsai in the past. The letter described the dissatisfaction of Tsai and her family to the company D Sound, including that D Sound didn't actually has the right to manage her business and short paid her. At the same time, Tsai's father said that he only wanted to clarify the contract with D Sound, and had no intention to sue D Sound. On the other hand, D Sound's manager Tso Ke-hui sent a legal attest letter to Tsai and her family on the grounds that they were involved in defamation. After that, Tsai's father decided to suspend Tsai's business activities since August 20, 2001.

On August 15, 2001, Tsai's lawyers Ting Hsi-cheng and Sun Shih-chun held a press conference together with Tsai and her family, and they unilaterally announced that Tsai ended the contractual relationship with D Sound. Later, D Sound and their lawyer Chang An-chi also held a press conference, announcing that Tsai's unilateral early termination of the contract was a breach of contract, and they demanded Tsai a public apology and a total of NT$10 million in damages. Meanwhile, Tsai Chu-chen pointed out that D Sound's manager David Wu had asked Tsai and her mother Huang Chun-mei to sign a consent after the Examinee Night Concert on July 10, 2000, the content of the consent includes Tsai authorized D Sound solely to sign all matters with Warner, and David Wu asked Tsai and her mother didn't tell her father. Tsai's father later found out the consent and expressed his dissatisfaction with it, David Wu later agreed to withdraw the consent, but Universal Music Taiwan's music director Sam Chen persuaded Tsai to sign the consent again after Tsai turned 20 years old. In response, Sam Chen issued a statement that the consent was a will without legal effect, and Warner would never cooperated with Tsai in the future, and he reserved the right to legal recourse of Tsai and her family's remarks at the press conference. Later, David Wu released a letter to Tsai and her family publicly, and he said that he would not sue Tsai for the time being.

In early November 2001, Tsai signed Angie Chai's company Comic Ritz, and then D Sound formally filed a criminal lawsuit against Tsai. On December 4, 2001, the Taiwan Taipei District Prosecutors Office held a court investigation. D Sound accused Tsai and her family of slander and demanded compensation of NT$27 million, while Tsai and her family pointed out that D Sound was suspected of embezzlement. On January 21, 2002, Tsai and D Sound filed for arbitration respectively, and the contractual dispute was expected to be settled around June 2002. Tsai's father also said that he has applied to the Taiwan Taipei District Court for a provisional punishment, which was approved by the court and an execution order was issued. Therefore, D Sound should not prevent Tsai from inviting third parties to record and distribute music publications, film advertisements, and act in televisions before the arbitration ruling. On January 29, 2002, D Sound filed a criminal complaint against Tsai again, alleging that Tsai's live performances at MTV Mandarin's Christmas party and TVBS-G's New Year's Eve concert in 2001 infringed on the recording copyright. Meanwhile, D Sound chose to make public the income statement related to Tsai to prove that the accounts were clean. On January 31, 2002, Tsai and D Sound attended the second arbitration tribunal.

On June 4, 2002, the Chinese Arbitration Association Taipei ruled that Tsai had to pay D Sound a total of NT$9 million for only two years of the seven-year contract. D Sound said: "The arbitration association's decision has cleared us of the charges that Jolin Tsai and her family had made against D Sound for breach of trust, embezzlement, and accounting irregularities." D Sound added: "D Sound is considering dropping the criminal defamation lawsuit against Jolin Tsai and her family. However, for the sake of protecting the rights and interests of the company, we will not revoke the criminal responsibility for Jolin Tsai's infringement of the recording copyright, because it involves intellectual property rights." Tsai's father said: "The arbitrator found that we have the right to terminate the contract, which means that D Sound had violated the trust and misappropriated the short payment."

Critical reception 
Tencent Entertainment's Shuwa commented: "The most amazing album during her Universal period. R&B, hip-hop, and other increasingly adept styles made Jolin Tsai's attempt in the musical style to be more bold, disco and rap made the whole album both listenable and popular to a higher level. As the last album during her Universal era, the production is still good enough to catch up with the integrity of Show Your Love. In terms of the whole album, Lucky Number contains almost all the musical styles Jolin Tsai tried during the Universal era, lyrical, cheerful, sad, rhythmic, which can be regarded as a periodic summary. At the time, Jolin Tsai's style of dance songs has been relatively stable, although it can't get rid of the girlish sentiment, but the quality is there. In addition, the first-time collaboration with Kay Huang and Paula Ma on this album changed Jolin Tsai's usual practice of collaborating only with male producers. Unfortunately, the contractual dispute with her management company affected the promotion of this album, which regrettably became Jolin Tsai's worst-selling album during the Universal era."

Accolades 
On January 25, 2002, the song "Lucky Number" won a China Music Award for Top Songs.

Track listing

Release history

References

External links 
 
 

2001 albums
Jolin Tsai albums
Universal Music Taiwan albums